Paramanandapur Jagannath Institution is a boys' high school situated in Balaipanda, Paramanandapur, Moyna, Purba Medinipur in the Indian state of West Bengal.

History
The school was established on 1 February, 1929 as a middle English School. On 2 January 1942 it was upgraded to a high English School. A resident of Paramanandapur, Iswar Chandra Jana, donated money for the Reserve Fund of the School. To commemorate his father the School was named after him as Paramanandapur Jagannath Institution. Abinash Chandra Chakraborty was appointed the first Headmaster.

Activities
Every year on the occasion of the Saraswati Puja festival the wall magazine Patraput is issued. The annual School Magazine Srijan is also published. The school runs a hostel catering to some four hundred students. The school maintains flower and vegetable gardens.

Facilities and campus
The school is situated slightly away from town on a large campus. The school auditorium, named Aikatan, has a seating capacity of 2000.
The school has a well-developed library named Nazrul Pathagar, with about 10,000 books. There are laboratories to cater for science subjects.

Boys' schools in India
Primary schools in West Bengal
High schools and secondary schools in West Bengal
Schools in Purba Medinipur district
Educational institutions established in 1942
1942 establishments in India